Cyril Holt (19 April 1917 – 26 August 1979) was an Australian rugby league footballer who played in the 1930s and 1940s.

Playing career
"Sipper' Holt was a local St. George junior that reached first grade in 1937. Also, Holt was a very accurate goal kicker. After two seasons, Cyril Holt left Sydney to continue his career at the N.S.W. town of Lithgow for four years and was selected to play for Country Firsts in 1942. 
Holt was called up to the RAAF and when stationed in Sydney in 1944 & 1945, he returned to play with St George before retiring from first grade.

Death
Holt died on 26 August 1979 at Lithgow, New South Wales aged 62.

References

1917 births
1979 deaths
St. George Dragons players
Royal Australian Air Force personnel of World War II
Rugby league players from Sydney
Rugby league centres
Royal Australian Air Force airmen